German National Socialist Workers' Party (Austria)
 German National Socialist Workers' Party (Czechoslovakia)